William Jerome Cagney (March 26, 1905 – January 3, 1988) was an American film producer and actor, remembered for roles in the Monogram Pictures films Lost in the Stratosphere and Flirting with Danger, both filmed in 1934.

Career
He produced several of his older lookalike brother James Cagney's films, including City for Conquest (1940), Johnny Come Lately (1943), Blood on the Sun (1945), The Time of Your Life (1948), Kiss Tomorrow Goodbye (1950), and A Lion Is in the Streets (1953). He was credited as an associate producer on The Bride Came C.O.D. (1941) and Yankee Doodle Dandy (1942), and he also handled his brother's business affairs, negotiating several of his Hollywood studio contracts.

Personal life
Cagney was married to actress Boots Mallory; they had two children together, Jill and Stephen, before their divorce in 1946. He next married Nadine Parker, and they had one child together, William Jr., before their divorce in 1954. Cagney died on January 3, 1988, in Newport Beach, California, aged 82.

Filmography

References

External links
 
 

1905 births
1988 deaths
American male film actors
American film producers
Burials at Pacific View Memorial Park
20th-century American male actors
20th-century American businesspeople